Joel Lok (born September 6, 1994) is a Singaporean-Australian actor born in Singapore and based in Melbourne, starring in the recent Australian film in 2007, The Home Song Stories, as the young character, Tom.  Joel is the youngest actor to receive an IF Award for his performance in this film.
Also widely known for starring in the 2013 Australian TV show 'Nowhere Boys' as Andrew 'Andy' Lau.

Filmography

Television

References

External links

1994 births
Living people
Australian male child actors
Australian male film actors
Australian people of Chinese descent